Callulops fojaensis is a species of frog in the family Microhylidae. It is only known from the Foja mountains in West Papua (Indonesia).

Description
Body is robust and pear-shaped, with wide head that is not distinct from the body. Limbs are short and robust. Iris is dark reddish brown. Tympanum is barely visible. Overall colouration is uniformly pale brown. Dorsal and lateral surfaces of head are slightly darker than dorsal and lateral surfaces of torso. Exposed surfaces of limbs are moderately pale brown, with forelimbs slightly darker than hind limbs and torso. Venter is very pale with faint brown mottling, darker on throat.

The advertisement call of male Callulops fojaensis is a series of loud, harsh barking notes aired at long intervals.

Habitat
The two known individuals were located calling from burrows in the forest floor during the late afternoon in a wet, mossy mid-montane forest, at about  asl. It appears to be a rare species as over four weeks of fieldwork did not reveal more specimens.

References

fojaensis
Amphibians of Western New Guinea
Endemic fauna of Indonesia
Endemic fauna of New Guinea
Amphibians described in 2012
Taxa named by Paul M. Oliver
Taxa named by Stephen J. Richards